Chthonius is a genus of pseudoscorpions, first described by Carl Ludwig Koch in 1843.

There are more than 100 species which are distributed from Europe to Iran, North Africa, Balearic Islands and the USA. There is one cosmopolitan species. There are also fossil species from the Eocene of Poland and the Russian Federation.

Species 
, the World Pseudoscorpiones Catalog accepts the following 121 species:

Chthonius absoloni Beier, 1938 — Bosnia, Croatia
Chthonius agazzii Beier, 1966 — Italy
Chthonius alpicola Beier, 1951 — Austria, Croatia, Germany, Italy, Slovenia
Chthonius apollinis Mahnert, 1978 — Greece
Chthonius aquasanctae Ćurčić & Rađa, 2011 — Serbia
Chthonius azerbaidzhanus Schawaller & Dashdamirov, 1988 — Azerbaijan
Chthonius balazuci Vachon, 1963 — France
Chthonius bogovinae Ćurčić, 1972 — Serbia
Chthonius campaneti Zaragoza & Vadell, 2013 — Spain
Chthonius caoduroi Callaini, 1987 — Italy
Chthonius caprai Gardini, 1977 — Italy
Chthonius carinthiacus Beier, 1951 — Austria, Czechia, Hungary, Italy, Romania, Slovakia, Slovenia, Switzerland
Chthonius cavernarum Ellingsen, 1909 — Italy, Romania, Slovenia
Chthonius cavophilus Hadži, 1939 — Bulgaria
Chthonius cebenicus Leclerc, 1981 — France
Chthonius cephalotes (Simon, 1875) — France
Chthonius chamberlini (Leclerc, 1983) — Algeria, France
Chthonius comottii Inzaghi, 1987 — Italy
Chthonius croaticus Ćurčić & Rađa, 2012 — Croatia
Chthonius cryptus Chamberlin, 1962 — Greece
Chthonius dacnodes Navás, 1918 — Netherlands, Portugal, Spain
Chthonius decoui Georgescu & Cǎpuşe, 1994 — Romania
Chthonius delmastroi Gardini, 2009 — Italy
Chthonius densedentatus Beier, 1938 — Albania, Bosnia, Croatia, France, Greece, Italy, Slovenia, Switzerland
Chthonius doderoi Beier, 1930 — France
Chthonius elongatus Lazzeroni, 1970 — Italy
Chthonius euganeus Gardini, 1991 — Italy
Chthonius exarmatus Beier, 1939 — Croatia, Montenegro
Chthonius gallettii Gardini, 2021 — Italy
Chthonius gentianae Gardini, 2021 — Italy
Chthonius gjirokastri Ćurčić, Rađa & Dimitrijević, 2008 — Albania
Chthonius globocicae Ćurčić, Dimitrijević & Tomić, 2008 — Montenegro
Chthonius graecus Beier, 1963 — Greece
Chthonius guglielmii Callaini, 1986 — France, Italy
Chthonius halberti Kew, 1916 — France, Ireland, Italy, Portugal, UK
Chthonius herbarii Mahnert, 1980 — Greece
Chthonius herminii Gardini, 2021 — Italy
Chthonius heterodactylus (Tömösváry, 1883) — Czechia, Germany, Greece, Hungary, Poland, Romania, Slovakia, Ukraine
Chthonius heurtaultae (Leclerc, 1981) — France
Chthonius horridus Beier, 1934 — Italy
Chthonius hungaricus Mahnert, 1981 — Hungary, Romania, Slovakia
Chthonius ilvensis Beier, 1963 — France, Italy
Chthonius imperator Mahnert, 1978 — Greece
Chthonius inguscioi Gardini, 2021 — Italy
Chthonius ischnocheles (Hermann, 1804) — Europe, US
Chthonius ischnocheloides Beier, 1973 — Italy
Chthonius italicus Beier, 1930 — France, Italy
Chthonius iugoslavicus Ćurčić, 1972 — Serbia
Chthonius jonicus Beier, 1931 — Albania, Greece, Israel, Italy, Lebanon, Malta, Portugal, Romania, Spain, Turkey
Chthonius jugorum Beier, 1952 — Austria, Italy
Chthonius karamanianus Hadži, 1937 — North Macedonia
Chthonius kladanjensis Ćurčić, Dimitrijević & Rađa, 2011 — Bosnia
Chthonius kosovensis Ćurčić, 2011 — Serbia
Chthonius lanai Gardini, 2021 — Italy
Chthonius lanzai Caporiacco, 1947 — Italy
Chthonius latidentatus Ćurčić, 1972 — Serbia
Chthonius leoi (Callaini, 1988) — Italy
Chthonius lesnik Ćurčić, 1994 — Serbia
Chthonius lessiniensis Schawaller, 1982 — Italy
Chthonius ligusticus Beier, 1930 — Italy, Romania
Chthonius lindbergi Beier, 1956 — Greece
Chthonius longimanus Ćurčič & Rađa, 2011 — Montenegro
Chthonius lucifugus Mahnert, 1977 — France, Spain
Chthonius lupinus Ćurčić, Dimitrijević & Rađa, 2011 — Bosnia
Chthonius macedonicus Ćurčić, 1972 — North Macedonia
Chthonius magnificus Beier, 1938 — Bosnia, Croatia
Chthonius makirina Ćurčić & Rađa, 2012 — Croatia
Chthonius marciai Gardini, 2021 — Italy
Chthonius mauritanicus (Callaini, 1988) — Morocco
Chthonius mayi Heurtault-Rossi, 1968 — France
Chthonius mazaurici Leclerc, 1981 — France
Chthonius microphthalmus Simon, 1879 — France, Italy
Chthonius minotaurus Henderickx, 1997 — Greece
Chthonius monicae Boghean, 1989 — Romania
Chthonius motasi Dumitresco & Orghidan, 1964 — Romania
Chthonius multidentatus Beier, 1963 — Italy
Chthonius nicolosii Gardini, 2021 — Italy
Chthonius occultus Beier, 1939 — Bosnia, Croatia
Chthonius ognjankae Ćurčić, 1997 — North Macedonia
Chthonius ohridanus Ćurčić, 1997 — North Macedonia
Chthonius onaei Ćurčić, Dimitrijević, Radja, Ćurčić & Milinčić, 2010 — Croatia
Chthonius orthodactyloides Beier, 1967 — Turkey
Chthonius orthodactylus (Leach, 1817) — Europe, Tunisia
Chthonius pacificus Muchmore, 1968 — US
Chthonius paganus (Hoff, 1961) — US
Chthonius pagus Ćurčić & Rađa, 2012 — Croatia
Chthonius paludis (Chamberlin, 1929) — US
Chthonius paolettii Beier, 1973 — Italy
Chthonius persimilis Beier, 1939 — Serbia
Chthonius petrochilosi Heurtault, 1972 — Greece
Chthonius ponticoides Mahnert, 1975 — Greece
Chthonius ponticus Beier, 1965 — Georgia, Turkey
Chthonius porevidi Ćurčić, Makarov & Lučić, 1998 — Montenegro
Chthonius pristani Ćurčić, 2011 — Croatia
Chthonius protobosniacus Ćurčić, Dimitrijević & Rađa, 2011 — Bosnia
Chthonius prove Ćurčić, Dimitrijević & Makarov, 1997 — Montenegro
Chthonius pusillus Beier, 1947 — Austria, Hungary, Slovenia
Chthonius pygmaeus Beier, 1934 — Austria, Croatia, Hungary, Italy, Slovakia, Slovenia, Switzerland
Chthonius radigost Ćurčić, 1997 — North Macedonia
Chthonius radjai Ćurčić, 1988 — Croatia
Chthonius raridentatus Hadži, 1930 — Austria, Croatia, Italy, Slovenia
Chthonius ressli Beier, 1956 — Austria, Czechia, France, Hungary, Italy, Monaco, Slovakia, Switzerland
Chthonius sestasi Mahnert, 1980 — Greece
Chthonius shelkovnikovi Redikorzev, 1930 — Armenia, Azerbaijan, Georgia, Greece, Iran, Turkey, Turkmenistan
Chthonius shulovi Beier, 1963 — Israel
Chthonius stammeri Beier, 1942 — Italy
Chthonius stevanovici Ćurčić, 1986 — Serbia
Chthonius strinatii Mahnert, 1975 — Greece
Chthonius submontanus Beier, 1963 — Austria, Germany, Italy, Romania, Switzerland
Chthonius subterraneus Beier, 1931 — Bosnia, Croatia, Hungary, Montenegro, Slovakia
Chthonius tadzhikistanicus Dashdamirov & Schawaller, 1992 — Tajikistan
Chthonius tenuis L. Koch, 1873 — Algeria, Tunisia, Europe
Chthonius thessalus Mahnert, 1980 — Greece
Chthonius torakensis Ćurčić & Rađa, 2010 — Croatia
Chthonius trebinjensis Beier, 1938 — Bosnia, Croatia
Chthonius troglobius Hadži, 1937 — North Macedonia
Chthonius troglodites Redikorzev, 1928 — Bulgaria
Chthonius tzanoudakisi Mahnert, 1975 — Greece
Chthonius vodan Ćurčić, 1997 — North Macedonia
Chthonius youtabae Zamani, Shoushtari, Kahrarian & Nassirkhani, 2020 — Iran
Chthonius zmaj Ćurčić, 1997 — North Macedonia

References

External links 
 
 
 
 
 Chthonius at insectoid.info

Pseudoscorpion genera
Chthoniidae